John Sibthorpe (1669–1718), of St. Mark's, Lincoln, was an English politician.

He was a Member (MP) of the Parliament of Great Britain for Lincoln from 1713 to 1715, but  made very little impact in the House.

He was buried on 27 April 1718 at St. Mark's church. He had married in 1703, Mary, the daughter and coheiress of Humphrey Browne of Lincoln and had 4 sons and a daughter. His widow acquired Canwick Hall, near Lincoln, which his son Coningsby Sibthorp, MP for Lincoln for many years and High Sheriff of Lincolnshire in 1733, would go on to inherit in 1727. A younger son, Humphry Sibthorp, was  a  noted botanist  who  held a chair in botany at Oxford University.

Family

References

1669 births
1718 deaths
People from Lincoln, England
Alumni of Christ Church, Oxford
Members of the Parliament of Great Britain for English constituencies
British MPs 1713–1715